Group B of the 2013 FIFA Confederations Cup took place from 16 to 23 June 2013 in Belo Horizonte's Mineirão, Fortaleza's Castelão, Recife's Arena Pernambuco, Rio de Janeiro's, Maracanã and Salvador's Arena Fonte Nova. The group consisted of Nigeria, Spain, Tahiti, and Uruguay.

Standings

In the semi-finals:
 The winners of Group B, Spain, advanced to play the runners-up of Group A, Italy.
 The runners-up of Group B, Uruguay, advanced to play the winners of Group A, Brazil.

Matches

Spain vs Uruguay

Tahiti vs Nigeria

Spain vs Tahiti

This game holds the record for the biggest margin of victory in a FIFA senior men's tournament. The previous record was nine goals which occurred three times: first when Hungary beat South Korea 9–0 at the 1954 FIFA World Cup; second when Yugoslavia defeated Zaire by the same score in 1974; and third when Hungary beat El Salvador 10–1 in 1982.

Nigeria vs Uruguay

Nigeria vs Spain

Uruguay vs Tahiti

References

External links
Official site
Official Documents and Match Documents

Group B